Half an Hour is a 1920 American silent drama film directed by Harley Knoles and written by Clara Beranger. The film stars Dorothy Dalton, Charles Richman, Albert L. Barrett, Frank Losee, and H. Cooper Cliffe. It is based on the 1913 play Half an Hour by J. M. Barrie. The film was released on September 19, 1920, by Paramount Pictures.

Plot
As described in a film magazine, Lady Lillian Garson (Dalton), whose marriage to man of wealth Richard Garson (Richman) has been in name only and the result of parental pressure, decides after an unpleasant meeting with her husband to take up the proposal of Hugh Paton (Barrett) and go with him to Egypt. He is due to sail within half an hour of the time she made her decision, so she leaves a note for her husband, takes the jewels he has given her, and makes her way to Paton's quarters, which are "just across the square." Paton leaves his apartment to get a cab and is struck by an automobile and killed. Dr. George Brodie (Losee), a friend of her husband's whom she has not met, brings the body into the house. Lady Lillian returns to her home, hoping to cover up her secret. She is successful in this, though she meets Dr. Brodie at dinner with her husband, and the doctor does not disclose the facts of the case. Destroying the note she had left behind, she happily realizes for the first time the greatness of her husband's love for her.

Cast
Dorothy Dalton as Lady Lillian Garson
Charles Richman as	Richard Garson
Albert L. Barrett as Hugh Paton 
Frank Losee as Dr. George Brodie
H. Cooper Cliffe as Earl of Westford

References

External links
 

1920 films
1920s English-language films
Silent American drama films
1920 drama films
Paramount Pictures films
Films based on works by J. M. Barrie
Films directed by Harley Knoles
American black-and-white films
American silent feature films
1920s American films